Anen or Aanen was an ancient Egyptian nobleman and official of the Eighteenth Dynasty. A priest and administrator, his period of royal service occurred largely during the reign of his brother-in-law, Amenhotep III.

Biography

He was the son of Yuya and Thuya and the brother of Queen Tiye, the wife of Pharaoh Amenhotep III. Under the rule of his brother-in-law, Anen became the Chancellor of Lower Egypt, Second Prophet of Amun, and sem-priest of Heliopolis, and acquired the title Divine Father.

A surviving statue of Anen is now in the Museo Egizio, Turin (Inv. No. 5484 /  Cat. 1377). A shabti of his is now in The Hague. Inscriptions on Anen's own monuments do not mention that he was Amenhotep III's brother-in-law. However, this relationship is established by a short but clear reference to him in his mother Thuya's coffin, which stated that her son Anen was the second prophet of Amun.

It is likely that he died before Year 30 of Amenhotep III, since he is not mentioned in texts relating to the pharaoh's Sed festival; in the last decade of Amenhotep's reign another man, Simut, took over Anen's place as Second Prophet of Amun. Simut had been Fourth Prophet of Amun previously.

Anen was buried in his tomb (TT120) in the Theban Necropolis, on the west bank of the Nile opposite Thebes. His son and four daughters are depicted in his tomb, but their names have not survived.

References

Prophets of Amun
Sem-priests
Chancellors of Lower Egypt
Officials of the Eighteenth Dynasty of Egypt
14th-century BC clergy
14th-century BC Egyptian people